There are at least 63 named lakes and reservoirs in Toole County, Montana.

Lakes
 Alkali Lake, el. 
 Aloe Lake, el. 
 Benton Trail Lakes, el. 
 Big Lake, el. 
 Cameron Lake, el. 
 Cowboys Lake, el. 
 Davis Lakes, el. 
 Fey Lakes, el. 
 Fitzpatrick Lake, el. 
 Fitzpatrick Lake, el. 
 Foxtail Lakes, el. 
 Frenchman Lake, el. 
 Goedertz Lake, el. 
 Hemmings Lake, el. 
 Jones Lake, el. 
 Long Lake, el. 
 Mc Carters Lake, el. 
 Moltz Lake, el. 
 Mud Lake, el. 
 Perkins Lake, el. 
 Ruby Johnson Lake, el. 
 Swan Lake, el. 
 Twin Lakes, el. 
 Twin Lakes, el. 
 Verden Lake, el. 
 Virden Lake, el.

Reservoirs
 Alkali Lake, el. 
 Berkholder Reservoir, el. 
 Big Dam, el. 
 Big Lake, el. 
 Cameron Reservoir, el. 
 Childers Reservoir, el. 
 Childrers Reservoir, el. 
 Christian Lake, el. 
 Christian Reservoir, el. 
 Cook Reservoir, el. 
 D Ratzburg Reservoir, el. 
 Dunkirk Reservoir, el. 
 Ed McIntyre Reservoir, el. 
 Gillespie Reservoir, el. 
 Goeddertz Reservoir, el. 
 Grassy Lake, el. 
 Jim Judisch Reservoir, el. 
 Lake Shel-oole, el. 
 M Ratzburg Reservoir, el. 
 MacHale Reservoir, el. 
 Mary Reservoir, el. 
 McCarter Lake, el. 
 McIntyre Reservoir, el. 
 McLean Reservoir, el. 
 Melcott Reservoir, el. 
 Morris Reservoir, el. 
 Morris Reservoir, el. 
 Ovens Reservoir, el. 
 Parsell Lake, el. 
 Shay Reservoir, el. 
 Summers Reservoir, el. 
 Suphellen Reservoir, el. 
 The Pot Hole, el. 
 Wanken Reservoir, el. 
 Wilson Reservoir, el. 
 Wood Reservoir, el.

See also
 List of lakes in Montana

Notes

Bodies of water of Toole County, Montana
Toole